Malden Hollow is a valley in Carter and Ripley County in the U.S. state of Missouri.

Malden Hollow was named after Ennis and John Malden, early settlers.

References

Valleys of Carter County, Missouri
Valleys of Ripley County, Missouri
Valleys of Missouri